Assa Koïta (born 28 June 1991 in Vitry-sur-Seine) is a French female rugby union player. She played at the 2014 Women's Rugby World Cup and was named to the tournament Dream Team. Koita was a member of the squad that won their fourth Six Nations title in 2014.

References

1991 births
Living people
People from Vitry-sur-Seine
Sportspeople from Val-de-Marne
French female rugby union players
French sportspeople of Malian descent